Ivica Gvozden (born 14 October 1968) is a Croatian retired football defender.  He later also became a professional futsal player.

Club career
After playing with NK Iskra Bugojno in the Yugoslav Second League since 1986, in 1990 he moved to Belgrade and signed with Yugoslav First League club FK Rad where he played until 1993. In 1994, he moved to Croatia and joined GNK Dinamo Zagreb, known as Croatia Zagreb back then.  In 1996, he moved to Germany where he played with Chemnitzer FC one and a half seasons playing in the Regionalliga Nordost.  During the winter break of the 1997–98 season, he returned to Croatia and signed with 1. HNL side HNK Šibenik. He played with HNK Grude in the 2001–02 Premier League of Bosnia and Herzegovina.

Futsal career
Ivica Gvozden was part of the Croatia national futsal team at the 2001 UEFA Futsal Championship.

References

1968 births
Living people
Association football defenders
Yugoslav footballers
Croatian footballers
NK Iskra Bugojno players
FK Rad players
GNK Dinamo Zagreb players
Chemnitzer FC players
HNK Šibenik players
Yugoslav First League players
First League of Serbia and Montenegro players
Regionalliga players
Croatian Football League players
Premier League of Bosnia and Herzegovina players
Croatian expatriate footballers
Expatriate footballers in Serbia and Montenegro
Croatian expatriate sportspeople in Serbia and Montenegro
Expatriate footballers in Germany
Croatian expatriate sportspeople in Germany
Expatriate footballers in Bosnia and Herzegovina
Croatian expatriate sportspeople in Bosnia and Herzegovina
Croatian men's futsal players